Eleanor Roosevelt High School  is a high school located in Eastvale, California. The school opened in 2006. It is currently the only high school located in Eastvale. It also has the eStem program.

Demographics
The school consists of 50% Hispanic, 18% white, 12% African American, 11% Asian, 5% Filipino and 1% multiracial.

Athletics
Roosevelt is part of California Interscholastic Federation (CIF) Big VIII League  along with Norco High School, Centennial High School, Santiago High School, Corona High School and Martin Luther King High School.

Fall sports
Football (freshman, JV, varsity)
Girls' cross-country
Boys' cross-country
Boys' water polo (freshman, JV, varsity)
Girls' volleyball (freshman, JV, varsity)
Girls' tennis (JV, varsity)
Girls' golf
Marching Band (JV, varsity)

Winter sports
Boys Basketball (Frsh, JV, Var)
Girls Basketball (Frsh, JV, Var)
Boys Soccer (Frsh, JV, Var)
Girls Soccer (Frsh, JV, Var)
Girls Water Polo (Frsh, JV, Var)
Boys Wrestling (Frsh,JV, Var)
Girls Wrestling (Frsh,JV, Var)

Spring sports
Baseball (Freshman, JV, Var)
Softball (Freshman, JV, Var)
Boys Volleyball (JV, Var)
Boys Golf (JV, Var)
Boys Lacrosse (JV, Var)
Girls Lacrosse (JV, Var)
Girls Track and Field (JV, Var)
Boys Track and Field (JV, Var)
Boys Swimming (JV, Var)
Girls Swimming (JV, Var)
Boys Tennis (JV, Var)

Notable alumni
Tyler Slavin, NFL wide receiver
Marcus Williams (safety), safety for the Baltimore Ravens
Chris Wilcox, cornerback for the Indianapolis Colts 
Matt Mitchell, professional basketball player for SIG Strasbourg of the French LNB Pro A

References

External links
 

Public high schools in California
High schools in Riverside County, California
2006 establishments in California